Aya El Shamy (born ) is an  Egyptian female volleyball player. She was part of the Egypt women's national volleyball team.

She won the gold medal at the 2011 Pan Arab Games. On club level she played for El Shams Club in 2011.

References

External links
http://u23.women.2015.volleyball.fivb.com/en/competition/teams/egy-egypt/players/aya-elshamy?id=46347
http://www.fivb.org/EN/volleyball/competitions/U20/2013/Teams.asp?Team=EGY
http://www.fivb.org/EN/volleyball/competitions/Junior/Women/2011/Teams.asp?Tourn=WJ2011&Team=EGY
http://www.dailynewsegypt.com/2016/12/12/604157/
https://www.latestafricanews.com/latest-update/2016/12/al-ahly-wins-2016-women-arab-clubs-volleyball-championship/
http://www.insidethegames.biz/articles/1034423/egypt-to-meet-cameroon-for-rio-2016-volleyball-berth

1995 births
Living people
Egyptian women's volleyball players
Place of birth missing (living people)